Flora M'mbugu-Schelling is a Tanzanian documentary filmmaker, best known for her film These Hands.

Life
Born in Tanzania, M'mbugu-Schelling studied at the Tanzanian School of Journalism before doing further study in Germany and France. Her debut film, Kumekucha (1987), won a gold medal at the New York International Film Festival. These Hands documents the work of Mozambican refugee women, working breaking rocks in a quarry in Tanzania.

Filmography
 Kumekucha [From Sun Up], 1987
 These Hands, 1992
 Shida and Matatizo, 1993

References

External links
 

Year of birth missing (living people)
Living people
Tanzanian film directors
Tanzanian women film directors
Documentary film directors
Women documentary filmmakers